The 1992 Soul Train Music Awards was held at the Shrine Auditorium in Los Angeles, California. The show aired live in select cities on March 10, 1992 (and was later syndicated in other areas), honoring the best in R&B, soul, rap, jazz, and gospel music from the previous year. The show was hosted by Patti LaBelle, Will Smith, Luther Vandross and Vanessa Williams.

Special awards

Heritage Award
 Prince

Sammy Davis Jr. Award for Entertainer of the Year
 Janet Jackson

Winners and nominees
Winners are in bold text.

Best R&B/Soul Album – Male
 Luther Vandross – Power of Love
 Will Downing – A Dream Fulfilled
 Tony Terry – Tony Terry
 Keith Washington – Make Time for Love

Best R&B/Soul Album – Female
 Natalie Cole – Unforgettable... with Love
 Mariah Carey – Emotions
 Lisa Fischer – So Intense
 Whitney Houston – I'm Your Baby Tonight

Best R&B/Soul Album – Group, Band or Duo
 Jodeci – Forever My Lady
 Guy – The Future
 Prince and the New Power Generation – Diamonds and Pearls
 BeBe & CeCe Winans – Different Lifestyles

Best R&B/Soul Single – Male
 Keith Washington – "Kissing You"
 Michael Jackson – "Black or White"
 Tony Terry – "With You"
 Luther Vandross – "Power of Love/Love Power"

Best R&B/Soul Single – Female
 Lisa Fischer – "How Can I Ease the Pain"
 Natalie Cole – "Unforgettable"
 Whitney Houston – "All the Man That I Need"
 Patti LaBelle – "Feels Like Another One"

Best R&B/Soul Single – Group, Band or Duo
 Color Me Badd – "I Wanna Sex You Up"
 Boyz II Men – "It's So Hard to Say Goodbye to Yesterday"
 Jodeci – "Forever My Lady"
 Sounds of Blackness – "Optimistic"

R&B/Soul Song of the Year
 Color Me Badd – "I Wanna Sex You Up"
 Boyz II Men – "It's So Hard to Say Goodbye to Yesterday"
 Jodeci – "Forever My Lady"
 BeBe & CeCe Winans – "Addictive Love"

Best Music Video
 MC Hammer – "Too Legit to Quit"
 Boyz II Men – "It's So Hard to Say Goodbye to Yesterday"
 Natalie Cole – "Unforgettable"
 Michael Jackson – "Black or White"

Best New R&B/Soul Artist
 Boyz II Men
 Color Me Badd
 Lisa Fischer
 Jodeci

Best Rap Album
 Public Enemy – Apocalypse '91
 Geto Boys – We Can't Be Stopped
 Heavy D and the Boyz – Peaceful Journey
 Naughty by Nature – Naughty by Nature

Best Gospel Album
 BeBe & CeCe Winans – Different Lifestyles
 Reverend James Cleveland and the L.A. Gospel Messengers – Reverend James Cleveland and the L.A. Gospel Messengers
 The Rance Allen Group – Phenomenon
 Sounds of Blackness – Evolution of Gospel

Best Jazz Album
 Natalie Cole – Unforgettable... with Love
 Gerald Albright – Dream Come True
 Alex Bugnon – 107 in the Shade
 Fourplay – Fourplay

Performers
 Heavy D & The Boyz – "Now That We Found Love"
 Naughty By Nature – "O.P.P."
 Patti LaBelle – "Somebody Loves You Baby (You Know Who It Is)" 
 Public Enemy – "Everything's Gonna Be Alright"
 Boyz II Men (with Michael Bivins) – "Motownphilly"
 DJ Jazzy Jeff & The Fresh Prince – "Summertime"
 Jodeci – "Forever My Lady"
 Prince Tribute:
 Stephanie Mills – "How Come U Don't Call Me Anymore?"
 Rosie Gaines – "Nothing Compares 2 U"
 Patti LaBelle – "Yo Mister"
 Color Me Badd – "I Wanna Sex You Up"
 Luther Vandross – "Don't Want to Be a Fool"
 Vanessa Williams – "The Comfort Zone"
 Bebe & Cece Winans – "It's OK"

Soul Train Music Awards, 1992
Soul Train Music Awards
Soul
Soul
1992 in Los Angeles